Port Austin Air Force Station (ADC ID: P-61, NORAD ID: Z-61) is a closed United States Air Force General Surveillance Radar station. It was closed in 1988 by the Air Force.

After the station's closure, it was replaced by the Federal Aviation Administration (FAA) at Canton, Michigan (near Detroit)  as part of the Joint Surveillance System (JSS), designated by NORAD as Eastern Air Defense Sector (EADS) Ground Equipment Facility J-62.

History
Port Austin Air Force Station was one of twenty-eight stations built as part of the second segment of the Air Defense Command permanent radar network. Prompted by the start of the Korean War, on July 11, 1950, the Secretary of the Air Force asked the Secretary of Defense for approval to expedite construction of the permanent network. Receiving the Defense Secretary's approval on July 21, the Air Force directed the Corps of Engineers to proceed with construction.

The 754th Aircraft Control and Warning Squadron was initially activated on 27 November 1950 at a temporary site at Oscoda AFB, Michigan (L-20) with an AN/TPS-1B radar.  It was assigned to Port Austin in July 1951 and began operating an AN/TPS-1C. The site then joined the Permanent radar network, and the squadron began using an AN/FPS-3 set, and initially the station functioned as a Ground-Control Intercept (GCI) and warning station.  As a GCI station, the squadron's role was to guide interceptor aircraft toward unidentified intruders picked up on the unit's radar scopes.

An AN/CPS-4 was added in 1954. This radar was replaced in 1957 by an AN/FPS-6 height-finder radar. A second AN/FPS-6 height-finder radar was added a year later. In 1958 this site began operating an AN/FPS-20 radar, which replaced the AN/FPS-3.

During 1959 Port Austin AFS joined the Semi Automatic Ground Environment (SAGE) system, feeding data to DC-06 at Custer AFS, Michigan.  After joining, the squadron was redesignated as the 754th Radar Squadron (SAGE) on  1 September 1959.  The radar squadron provided information 24/7 the SAGE Direction Center where it was analyzed to determine range, direction altitude speed and whether or not aircraft were friendly or hostile.

In early 1962 the site received and operated an AN/FPS-24 search radar, and the AN/FPS-20 was retired. On 31 July 1963, the site was redesignated as NORAD ID Z-61.  In 1963 an AN/FPS-26A height-finder radar (serial # 51)
 was installed, and one AN/FPS-6 was removed later that year. The other AN/FPS-6 was removed in 1968.

Over the years, the equipment at the station was upgraded or modified to improve the efficiency and accuracy of the information gathered by the radars.  The site came under Tactical Air Command control in October 1979 with the inactivation of Aerospace Defense Command and the transfer of the site to Air Defense, Tactical Air Command (ADTAC).

Circa 1982, the main bearing of the AN/FPS-24 search radar failed catastrophically. The FAA long-range radar site at Canton (Detroit), MI, was then used as a temporary data-tie site until an AN/FPS-91A search radar could be installed at Port Austin AFS in 1983. Also, the AN/FPS-26A was replaced by an AN/FPS-116 height-finder radar for the JSS Program. The site remained in use as an Air Force site until 30 September 1988 when it was closed altogether, again replaced by the FAA radar site at Canton.

Air Force units and assignments

Units
 Constituted as the 754th Aircraft Control and Warning Squadron on 14 November 1950
 Activated 27 November 1950 at Oscoda AFB, MI
 Moved to Port Austin AFS on 20 July 1951
 Redesignated 754th Radar Squadron (SAGE) on 1 September 1959
 Redesignated 754th Radar Squadron on 1 February 1974
 Inactivated on 30 September 1988

Assignments
 541st Aircraft Control and Warning Group, 1 January 1951
 30th Air Division, 6 February 1952
 4708th Defense Wing, 16 February 1953
 30th Air Division, 8 July 1956
 Detroit Air Defense Sector, 1 April 1959
 34th Air Division, 1 April 1966
 29th Air Division, 14 November 1969
 23d Air Division, 19 November 1969
 21st Air Division, 1 August 1981
 24th Air Division, 1 September 1983
 Northeast Air Defense Sector, 1 December 1987 – 1 October 1988

See also
 List of United States Air Force aircraft control and warning squadrons
 United States general surveillance radar stations

Notes

References

 Grant, C.L.,  The Development of Continental Air Defense to 1 September 1954, (1961), USAF Historical Study No. 126
 
 
 Winkler, David F. & Webster, Julie L., Searching the Skies, The Legacy of the United States Cold War Defense Radar Program,  US Army Construction Engineering Research Laboratories, Champaign, IL (1997).
 Information for Port Austin AFS, MI

Installations of the United States Air Force in Michigan
Semi-Automatic Ground Environment sites
Aerospace Defense Command military installations
Military installations established in 1951
Military installations closed in 1988
1951 establishments in Michigan
1988 disestablishments in Michigan